Leah Nicole Ryerse is a beauty queen who represented Canada in Miss World 2008 in Johannesburg, South Africa.  She completed her second year at McMaster with a double Honours Bachellor of Arts in Health and Social Work.

1988 births
Living people
Miss World 2008 delegates
People from Hamilton, Ontario
McMaster University alumni
Miss World Canada winners